Michael Joseph Madigan (born April 19, 1942) is an American politician who is the former speaker of the Illinois House of Representatives. He was the longest-serving leader of any state or federal legislative body in the history of the United States, having held the position for all but two years from 1983 to 2021. He served in the Illinois House from 1971 to 2021. He represented the 27th District from 1971 to 1983, the 30th district from 1983 to 1993, and the 22nd district from 1993 to 2021. This made him the body's longest-serving member and the last legislator elected before the Cutback Amendment.

Chicago Magazine named Madigan as the fourth most powerful Chicagoan in 2012 and as the second in both 2013 and 2014, earning him the nickname "the Velvet Hammer—a.k.a. the Real Governor of Illinois." Rich Miller, editor of Illinois political newsletter the Capitol Fax, wrote, "the pile of political corpses outside Madigan's Statehouse door of those who tried to beat him one way or another is a mile high and a mile wide."

On January 11, 2021, Madigan announced he would be suspending his effort to be elected to a nineteenth term as Speaker of the Illinois House of Representatives, and on January 13, he was replaced by fellow Democrat Emanuel "Chris" Welch.  Madigan announced that he would resign as state representative effective at the end of February. On February 18, he announced that his resignation would take effect that same day.

On March 2, 2022, Madigan was indicted on federal racketeering charges. He is set to stand on trial in April 2024.

Early life and career 
Madigan's father, Michael, was "a very strong Democrat, he was a product of the Depression ... He carried with him very strong feelings in favor of many of the enactments of the New Deal." Michael J. Flynn was the Cook County Clerk, and also the Democratic committeeman of Chicago's 13th Ward, an unpaid, political-party leadership position. Madigan's father was a precinct captain in the 13th Ward and worked in the Cook County Clerk's office, where he befriended a young Richard J. Daley, who would later succeed Flynn as County Clerk prior to running for mayor of Chicago. Madigan later characterized the relationship between his father and Richard J. Daley as "political friends." The elder Michael Madigan later worked for 25 years as the 13th Ward superintendent for the City of Chicago Department of Streets and Sanitation.

Madigan was born on April 19, 1942 and was raised in the Clearing neighborhood of Chicago. Madigan graduated from Saint Adrian's Elementary School, St. Ignatius College Prep on the west side of Chicago, and the University of Notre Dame. In 1965, while a first-year law student at Loyola University Chicago School of Law, Madigan purchased a membership in the Lake Shore Club and introduced himself to Chicago Mayor Richard J. Daley as Michael Madigan's son. Within months, at Madigan's father's request, Mayor Daley appointed Madigan to a summer job with the city law department between his first and second years of law school. Madigan also met Daley's son, Richard M. Daley, while both were law students. Madigan's father suffered a heart attack at age 58, and a fatal heart attack at age 60, in 1966. Madigan graduated from Loyola Law School in 1967. Madigan and Neil Hartigan worked together in the city law department. Madigan and Richard M. Daley were both delegates to the 1969-70 Illinois Constitutional convention (which wrote the current Constitution of Illinois, adopted after Illinois voters approved it in the 1970 special election), and became good friends.

In 1972, Madigan founded the private law firm of Madigan and Getzendanner with Vincent J. "Bud" Getzendanner Jr., a fellow Loyola law graduate, one year his senior. In 1976, Madigan married Shirley Murray, a divorced law firm receptionist with a young daughter, Lisa, whom Madigan adopted; Lisa later became Attorney General of Illinois in 2003.

Democratic Party leadership 

Madigan joined Chicago Mayor Jane Byrne in endorsing Alderman Edward M. Burke in the 1980 Democratic primary race for Cook County State's Attorney, over Madigan's friend Richard M. Daley.

In 1986 Madigan urged Adlai Stevenson III to enter the Democratic primary for Illinois governor. Hartigan withdrew and Stevenson won the primary and was defeated by James R. Thompson for the second time.

13th Ward Democratic committeeman 

In 1969 the 13th Ward precinct captains elected Madigan their committeeman, making him, at age 27, the youngest ward committeeman in Chicago at the time. Madigan's ward organization has been called the most disciplined in Chicago.

Chairman of the Democratic Party of Illinois 

In 1998 the Illinois Democratic Party's Central Committee elected Madigan chair of the Democratic Party of Illinois. Madigan succeeded his protégé and former chief of staff, Gary LaPaille. Madigan fired the state party staff, closed its headquarters in the Merchandise Mart in Chicago, and moved it to Springfield, Illinois to the same office building as his campaign finance committee staff.

Madigan's position as the Democratic Party Chair was challenged by Mateusz Tomkowiak during the March 2018 Democratic primary for state central committeeman of the 3rd Congressional District.

On February 22, 2021, Madigan resigned as chairman.

Illinois House of Representatives 

In November 1970 Madigan was elected to represent the 22nd District in the Illinois House of Representatives. The district, on Chicago's southwest side in the area surrounding Midway International Airport, has recently become majority Hispanic.

Speaker of the Illinois House 

Madigan was Speaker of the Illinois House from 1983 to 2021, with the exception of 1995–1997 when Republicans took control of the Illinois House and Lee Daniels of Elmhurst became Speaker. Madigan recruited candidates who appealed to south suburban Chicago voters and the Illinois House Democratic Majority political action committee he controls spent $272,000 in six south suburban races. Democrats won back nine seats in the Illinois House in the elections of November 1996, regained a majority, and Madigan resumed the Speaker's role and held it until January 2021. He is the longest-serving state House speaker in United States history.

Beginning in the 1980 United States Census, and except in the 1990s, Madigan was the chief mapmaker of the legislative districts of the Illinois General Assembly and the United States Congress in Illinois and during reapportionment he designs the Illinois House districts to increase his majority.

After 2002when Democrats took control of all branches of the state governmentMadigan feuded with leading Democrats Governor Rod Blagojevich and Senate President Emil Jones.

Some political observers were critical of the level of control Madigan came to hold over Illinois politics, describing him as the state's political boss.

In 2016, Madigan was the subject and namesake of a documentary made by the Illinois Policy Institute. The documentary was widely criticized as overly partisan and raised ethical concerns after individuals featured in the movie claimed they were not told the nature of their interviews. In May 2019 Madigan supported a bill to change Illinois's tax rate from a flat rate to a graduated tax rate and sponsored a bill to fine businesses for profiting from human trafficking, involuntary servitude, or sex trade activities.

In January 2021, Madigan announced he would be suspending his campaign for Speaker of the Illinois House after it became apparent that he would not receive the 60 votes necessary to win. On January 13, the Illinois House voted to instead elect Emanuel Chris Welch to the Speakership, making him the first African American to hold that position. A federal corruption investigation related to Madigan's conduct continued despite his ouster as speaker.

Relationship with Blagojevich 
Madigan and Blagojevich clashed over Blagojevich's proposals for increased state spending. Blagojevich blamed the 2007 budget crisis on Madigan, releasing a statement that said, "The way to be able to finally get budgets that achieve the objective of health care and education for families is to get Mr. Madigan to be a Democrat again and stop being a George Bush Republican." Madigan refused to meet with Blagojevich for more than two months after Blagojevich introduced the budget; rather than the proposed $5 billion in increased spending, he recommended $1 billion, funded by the ending of a tax break. When talks stalled, Madigan invited the entire House to accompany him to budget negotiations.

Madigan opposed Blagojevich's proposed gross receipts tax in 2007. He said the tax was "regressive" and would hurt the poor, who are "the least able in our society to take on additional costs."

Illinois senior Senator Dick Durbin said in 2008 that he received many constituent complaints about the dispute between Blagojevich and Madigan, with letter writers wanting him to step in to negotiate. Durbin said the subject was also often talked about in the United States Congress in Washington, D.C. among the Illinois congressional delegation. Durbin joked that he would rather go to Baghdad to mediate than Springfield.

The Chicago Sun-Times statehouse bureau reporter of 13 years, Dave McKinney, said of Madigan's style as Speaker:

The relationship between Blagojevich and Madigan hit its low in October 2007, when Blagojevich fired Bronwyn Rains, wife of Madigan's chief of staff Timothy Mapes, from her position of psychologist with the Illinois Department of Children and Family Services. Blagojevich said he based this on Rains's educational background. She had worked for the department for 24 years with no prior record of problems; one observer called the fallout "nuclear war."

Senate Republican Leader Frank Watson and House Republican Leader Tom Cross often met with Madigan, his Senate counterpart at the time Emil Jones, and Blagojevich in an attempt to referee disputes. In August 2008, Blagojevich stated that House Democrats who held City of Chicago jobs were fearful of voting in favor of his 2008 capital bill because they thought Madigan might be able to get them fired.  Blagojevich told reporters:

They fear their leader, Mr. Madigan, and if Mike Madigan tells them to vote a certain way, they will tell you privately, and I've had these discussions with a couple of state reps, one of whom said, 'I'm afraid if I vote for the jobs bill I'll be fired from my job at Streets and Sanitations . I'm afraid I'll lose my job.'

Representative Gary Hannig told the newspaper that Blagojevich had told House Democrats he was referring to John C. D'Amico. When contacted, D'Amico said that Blagojevich had asked him if he feared losing his job with the City of Chicago's water department, at which point D'Amico said that he had been in a union for 26 years and could not be fired easily, and instead opposed the capital bill because Mayor Richard M. Daley opposed it.

On December 15, 2008, Madigan announced that he was taking steps to initiate impeachment proceedings against Blagojevich after the governor was arrested on charges of conspiracy and fraud. He named Illinois House of Representatives Majority Leader Barbara Flynn Currie to Chair the 21-member House committee on impeachment. After the committee reported, Madigan presided over the House deliberations which unanimously voted for the first impeachment of an Illinois governor. Subsequently, the Illinois Senate tried and removed Blagojevich from office, also by a unanimous vote.

Controversy over UIUC admissions 

Madigan refused to testify in the inquiry over his advocacy for more than 40 applicants to the University of Illinois Urbana-Champaign. Governor Pat Quinn appointed a commission, to be led by retired Judge Abner Mikva, to investigate attempts by lawmakers and others to influence admissions of unqualified candidates (whose relatives had given money to Madigan, other lawmakers, and the state Democratic Party, which Madigan chairs) at the state's largest university. The August 6, 2009 Admissions Review Commission report stated that the university's top officials (trustees, president, chancellor) were the most culpable, because they should have refused the lawmakers' requests, although he also said a separate commission should be established by Quinn and/or the legislature to look into possible misconduct by Madigan and others.

Metra patronage scandal 

In the summer of 2013 it was reported that Madigan had sought to use his influence to secure patronage hiring and promotion at the Metra commuter rail agency for two of his supporters. Metra CEO Alex Clifford rejected these requests, and alleges that the agency's board sought his resignation as a result.

In the wake of this scandal five Metra board members resigned, but Madigan denied violating any ethics rules. An investigation by the Legislative Inspector General found that Madigan "should have realized, given his influential position, that by making the [personnel] requests at the conclusion of meetings with Metra officials to discuss funding and other legislative issues, he would be creating reciprocal expectations."

More than 400 current or retired state and local government employees have strong political ties to Madigan, according to a 2014 investigation by the Chicago Tribune. The former Bureau of Electricity in the Streets and Sanitation Department of the City of Chicago was called "Madigan Electric" by political insiders. Madigan recommended at least 26 individuals for jobs at Metra from 1983 to 1991.

Campaign contributions 

Madigan has admitted that he is more likely to return phone calls from campaign contributors than from non-contributors.

Of all the current sitting Democratic Illinois House members, Madigan has received the most campaign contributions from labor unions. Between 2002 and 2012, he received $670,559. This sum includes:
 $56,114 from AFL-CIO
 $50,000 from AFSCME
 $63,600 from Illinois Education Association
 $161,000 from the Illinois Federation of Teachers
 $135,000 from the Chicago Teachers Union
 $204,845 from the Service Employees International Union
On January 1, 2016, the Chicago Tribune reported that Madigan "has been on a fundraising tear, courtesy of a quirk in state campaign finance law that allows him to amass multiple five-figure contributions from the same donor into four funds he controls." In 2015, Madigan raised more than $7 million. Over 68% of the money that Madigan raised in 2015 came from trial lawyers, law firms, and organized labor unions.

Illinois created its first limit on campaign contributions for the legislature in 2009, but the law allowed politicians to raise money for various campaign funds for their political parties and caucuses. Madigan controls four different campaign fundraising organizations: Friends of Michael J Madigan, the Democratic Majority fund, the Southwest Side 13th Ward fund and the Democratic Party of Illinois account. Additionally, over the past 15 years, Madigan raised more than $658,000 in donations from the Illinois Trial Lawyers Association (ITLA) Legislative PAC.

Tax policy 
In early 2011 leading Illinois Democratic lawmakers and Governor Pat Quinn agreed to raise the Illinois state income tax from 3 to 5.25 percent—a 75% increase. At the time, it was estimated that this would bring in about $7.5 billion a year. The tax increase would mean that a married couple with two kids earning $80,000 a year combined would pay an extra $1,620 in taxes. Democratic leaders said the plan would pull the state out of its $15 billion budget hole. They promised the tax hike would last just four years, and then fall to 3.75 percent.

Between 2011 and 2014 the Illinois state income tax rate was 5 percent. On January 1, 2015, the tax rate was reduced from 5 percent to 3.75 percent, creating a shortfall in revenue of $2.7 billion starting FY 2015. Madigan has said that he would rather increase income taxes than sales taxes. On other occasions, he has introduced budgets that raise taxes in Illinois.

May 2016 tax and budget plan 
On May 25, 2016, Madigan introduced a budget plan that increased spending and "set the state on autopilot for the next year", according to the Chicago Tribune. Madigan's plan allocated $700 million more in funds to public schools. The $700 million would be doled out to poorer school districts such as Chicago Public Schools.

The Illinois Office of Management and Budget said that the tax rate for an average family in Illinois would have to go up by $1,000 to pay for Madigan's plan. That amounts to an increase of the income tax rate to 5.5 percent. Governor Bruce Rauner said that the budget was "the biggest unbalanced budget in Illinois history."

Madigan's plan passed the Illinois House of Representatives on May 25 by a vote of 63 in favor and 53 opposed. The Republican leader in the Illinois House, Jim Durkin, said the bill was "absolutely the biggest joke." Among those opposed were seven Democratic representatives. The seven were targeted for defeat in the fall 2016 campaigns.

Madigan's tax plan proposed spending $47.5 billion for fiscal year 2017. The state estimated that it would bring in approximately $40.5 billion in revenue, meaning that Madigan's budget spends around $7 billion more than the state would have available through tax revenue. The Illinois Policy Institute, a conservative think tank, estimated that the state would need to increase people's income tax from 3.75 to 5.5 percent in order to make up for Madigan's budget gap. The think tank estimated that the increase would amount to around $1,000 on average per family in Illinois.

The City Club comments 
In December 2015 the state of Illinois had had no budget in place for over five months. On December 9, at the City Club in Chicago, Madigan publicly said he thought the state income tax should increase to "at least 5 percent to balance the state's out-of-whack finances".

The Chicago Tribune wrote, "In doing so, Madigan potentially gave new life to Republican Gov. Bruce Rauner's argument that Democrats are to blame for the stalemate in Springfield because they're intent on only raising taxes to dig out of the state budget deficit."

Madigan's exact words were, "A good place to begin, good place to begin would be the level we were at before the income tax expired. ... And starting there, you can go in whatever direction you want to go."

Tax increase reform proposals 
One of Madigan's ideas to raise taxes is to pass a state constitutional amendment that would raise taxes on "millionaires to pay for public schools."

Madigan also has a plan for a graduated rate increase. State representative Lou Lang, a deputy under Madigan, formally introduced Madigan's proposal that would change how Illinois taxpayers are taxed at the state level. Instead of being taxed a flat rate, people would be taxed at a graduated rate, with the rate increasing for higher incomes.

The Tax Foundation released a report in early 2016, using figures from 2011, that showed that Illinois had the fifth-highest tax burden in the United States. Illinois had the second-highest burden when compared to other states in the midwest. Under Madigan's proposal, those figures would change: Illinois would have the fourth-highest and highest tax burden in the U.S. and midwest, respectively. In 2012, Illinois' tax burden was the second highest in the midwest, after Wisconsin, but before Wisconsin Governor Scott Walker passed tax cuts.

Pension reduction legislation 

Madigan was instrumental in the passage of SB-1, a plan that amended state employee pension plans by drastically reducing the constitutionally protected benefits of Illinois state employees in retirement. The Illinois Supreme Court ultimately found these legislative changes to be unconstitutional.

As the Illinois Supreme Court ruling stated: "These modifications to pension benefits unquestionably diminish the value of the retirement annuities the members ... were promised when they joined the pension system. Accordingly, based on the plain language of the Act, these annuity-reducing provisions contravene the pension protection clause's absolute prohibition against diminishment of pension benefits and exceed the General Assembly's authority".

Paprocki eucharist decree

On June 6, 2019, Bishop Thomas Paprocki issued a decree barring Madigan and Senate President John Cullerton from presenting themselves to receive the Eucharist on account of their role in passing the Reproductive Health Act, which removes spousal consent and waiting periods for abortions. While singling out Madigan and Cullerton specifically, Paprocki also asked that other legislators who voted for the bill not present themselves for Communion either, saying that they had "cooperated in evil and committed grave sin." Madigan said that Paprocki had warned him that he would be forbidden to take the sacrament if he permitted the House to debate and vote on the measure.

Resignation

On February 18, 2021 Madigan announced through a letter to the Speaker of the Illinois House that he would be resigning from the state representative post which will be effective at the end of February.

Madigan and Getzendanner 

Madigan was founder and continues as senior partner of the law firm Madigan and Getzendanner, specializing in corporate real estate property tax appeals, which has been accused of profiting from Madigan's position and power. Getzendanner and four other staff attorneys handle the tax appeals, while Madigan brings in clients. In 2008 Madigan and Getzendanner represented 45 of the 150 most valuable buildings in downtown Chicago, more than any other property tax appeal firm, and more than twice as many as the second-highest. Clients include the John Hancock Center and the Prudential Plaza. From 2006 to 2008 in Cook County, Illinois, Madigan and Getzendanner received the largest reductions for their clients of any tax appeal law firm. Venues for property tax appeals law firms in Cook County include hearings before the County Assessor, the County Board of Review, and the County courts. Judges in Illinois are elected in partisan elections, and Madigan, by his Democratic Party leadership roles as committeeman and state chairman, is one of the main persons involved in slating judicial candidates.

After the death of veteran 45th Ward committeeman and longtime chairman of the Cook County Democratic Party Thomas G. Lyons in January 2007, Cook County Democrats met in Chicago on February 1 to fill the vacancy. Madigan nominated Joseph Berrios, a former Illinois State Representative, then a Commissioner on the Cook County Board of Review. Cook County Democrats elected Berrios their new chairman. Madigan political workers aided Berrios's 2010 campaign for Cook County Assessor. Berrios is registered as a lobbyist to Illinois state government and advocates for issues including expanding video poker. Berrios lobbies Madigan in Springfield, while the Assessor is critical to the lucrative commercial real-estate tax appeals practices of law firms, including Madigan's. "Even by Illinois's loose conflict of interest standards, the obviousness of the Madigan-Berrios connection is stupefying," wrote Chicago Magazine in 2013. Berrios went on to lose to Fritz Kaegi in the Democratic primary for Cook County Assessor in March 2018. Kaegi then won the general election.

The Madigan family and their role in Illinois government 
Madigan and his wife, Shirley, have four children. His oldest daughter, Lisa Madigan, served as Attorney General of Illinois from 2003 to 2019. Madigan is not Lisa's biological father: she was born Lisa Murray to Shirley and criminal attorney Joel Murray. They divorced and Shirley married Madigan when Lisa was 10 years old. Lisa changed her name when she was 18 and was formally adopted in her 20s. Shirley is the head of the Illinois Arts Council. Madigan's son-in-law Jordan Matyas is the chief lobbyist for Regional Transportation Authority, a deputy chief overseeing their Government Affairs Department.

In 2002 Madigan helped Lisa garner more campaign contributions in her run for Illinois Attorney General than even the candidates for governor that year. At one point, Lisa Madigan's $1.2 million raised was more than all the attorney general candidates in 1998 had raised, combined.

Allegations of misconduct in campaign contributions arose during the 2002 campaign. Madigan was accused of using taxpayer dollars for political purposes. His staffers made numerous visits at public expense to contested Illinois House districts in the winter and spring before the November 2000 election. The Republican gubernatorial candidate, Jim Ryan, suggested that Madigan should resign. Lisa Madigan was running for Attorney General that year and called the allegations baseless. Her opponent in the race called on her to pay back taxpayer-paid bonuses her father had paid staffers before they departed to work on his daughter's campaign. A federal investigation into one of Lisa Madigan's political endorsements ensued after Madigan allegedly contacted a union boss in Chicago shortly before the union endorsed Madigan's daughter for the post, but nothing came of it.

Electoral history

See also
 List of Illinois state legislatures

References

External links

Representative Michael J. Madigan (D) 22nd District at the 98th Illinois General Assembly
Previous sessions: 97th, 96th, 95th, 94th, 93rd
Chairman Michael J. Madigan of the Democratic Party of Illinois
 
Profile at OurCampaigns.com
 profile
Rep. Michael J. Madigan at Illinois House Democrats
Michael Madigan featured articles at the Chicago Tribune
Top Michael Madigan Articles collection of news and information related to Michael Madigan published by the  Chicago Tribune and its partners
The Madigan Rules ongoing coverage of Madigan at the Chicago Tribune
Michael Madigan article archive at the Chicago Reader
House Speaker Michael Madigan article archive at the Chicago Reader
Michael Madigan audio, video and article archive at CBS Chicago
Michael Madigan video and article archive at NBC Chicago
Michael J. Madigan biography on the website of Madigan & Getzendanner, Madigan's law firm

|-

|-

|-

|-

|-

|-

|-

|-

1942 births
2000 United States presidential electors
21st-century American politicians
American people of Irish descent
Catholics from Illinois
Illinois Democratic Party chairs
Living people
Loyola University Chicago School of Law alumni
Politicians from Chicago
American political bosses from Illinois
Speakers of the Illinois House of Representatives
Democratic Party members of the Illinois House of Representatives
St. Ignatius College Prep alumni
University of Notre Dame alumni